Combera is a genus of flowering plants belonging to the family Solanaceae.

Its native range is Southern South America.

Species:

Combera minima 
Combera paradoxa

References

Solanaceae
Solanaceae genera